The Clay City National Bank Building, located on 6th Ave. in Clay City, Kentucky, was built in 1890.  It was listed on the National Register of Historic Places in 1976.

It is a two-story brick building,  in plan.  Its front is three bays wide.

It has served as the Red River Historical Museum.

It was noted to be "one of the few nineteenth-century buildings to survive in Clay City and the most substantial early structure remaining on the main thoroughfare of the town."

References

National Register of Historic Places in Powell County, Kentucky
Commercial buildings completed in 1890
Museums in Powell County, Kentucky
1890 establishments in Kentucky
Bank buildings on the National Register of Historic Places in Kentucky